Mario Gruppioni (13 September 1901 – 19 January 1939) was an Italian wrestler and Olympic medalist in Greco-Roman wrestling.

Olympics
Gruppioni competed at the 1932 Summer Olympics in Los Angeles where he received a bronze medal in Greco-Roman wrestling, the light heavyweight class.

References

External links
 

1901 births
1939 deaths
Olympic wrestlers of Italy
Wrestlers at the 1932 Summer Olympics
Italian male sport wrestlers
Olympic bronze medalists for Italy
Olympic medalists in wrestling
Medalists at the 1932 Summer Olympics
20th-century Italian people